Thane Alexander Campbell,  (July 7, 1895 – September 28, 1978) was a Prince Edward Island politician and jurist, who served as the 19th premier of Prince Edward Island from 1936 to 1943.

Early life
Born in Summerside, Prince Edward Island, the son of Alexander and Clara (Muttart) Campbell, Campbell was educated at Summerside Public School and Prince of Wales College. He received a Bachelor of Arts from Saint Dunstan's University and Master of Arts from Dalhousie University. A Rhodes Scholar, he received a Master of Arts degree from Corpus Christi College, Oxford. Returning to PEI in 1922, he read law with A. C. Saunders in Summerside.

Politics
Campbell first ran for a seat in the Legislative Assembly of Prince Edward Island in a 1930 by-election as the Liberal candidate in 2nd Prince but lost. In 1930, he was appointed Attorney General of Prince Edward Island. He was elected for 1st Prince in 1931 and re-elected in 1935 and was appointed Attorney and Advocate General in Premier Walter Lea's cabinet.

When Premier Lea died in 1936, Campbell succeeded him. Campbell's government organised the provincial police, passed the province's first law governing the public service and established a national park. With the beginning of World War II, Campbell's government committed itself to organising the province for the war effort.

Judicial career
In 1943, Campbell left politics to become Chief Justice on the island's Supreme Court and, in 1970, became head of the Foreign Claims Commission. While Chief Justice he saw his son, Alexander B. Campbell, sworn in as premier in 1966.

Curling
A curler, he joined the Summerside Curling Club in 1928. He was President of the PEI Curling Association in 1936. He served as President of the Dominion Curling Association from 1941 to 1942. In 2007, he was posthumously inducted into the Prince Edward Island Curling Hall of Fame and Museum. In 1974, he was inducted into the Canadian Curling Hall of Fame in the builder category.

Honours
In 1973 he was made a Companion of the Order of Canada.

Family life
He married Cecilia Bradshaw (1906–1968) on 28 February 1930. They had four children: Virginia; Alex; Harriet; and J. Melville.

References

1895 births
1978 deaths
Alumni of Corpus Christi College, Oxford
Canadian Rhodes Scholars
Companions of the Order of Canada
Curling Canada presidents
Members of the United Church of Canada
People from Summerside, Prince Edward Island
Premiers of Prince Edward Island
Prince Edward Island Liberal Party MLAs
Prince Edward Island Liberal Party leaders
Prince of Wales College alumni
Saint Dunstan's University alumni
Dalhousie University alumni